Lorenzo Gasperoni (born 3 January 1990) is a Sammarinese footballer currently playing at Libertas and for the San Marino national football team. He plays as an attacking midfielder.

International
Gasperoni made his debut for the senior team in October 2013. He played the penultimate match of 2014 FIFA World Cup Qualification. San Marino travelled to Chişinău to play against Moldova. Gasperoni came on for Carlo Valentini as an eightieth-minute substitute as San Marino lost 3–0 in the Zimbru Stadium.

References

1990 births
Living people
Sammarinese footballers
San Marino international footballers
Association football midfielders
A.C. Juvenes/Dogana players
Campionato Sammarinese di Calcio players